Natalya Kalashinkova is a Soviet sprint canoer who competed in the late 1970s and early 1980s. She was born in Trakai, Lithuanian SSR. She won three medals at the ICF Canoe Sprint World Championships with a gold (K-2 500 m: 1979) and two silvers (K-2 500 m:1978, K-4 500 m: 1983).

References

Living people
Sportspeople from Trakai
Soviet female canoeists
Year of birth missing (living people)
Lithuanian female canoeists
ICF Canoe Sprint World Championships medalists in kayak
Honoured Masters of Sport of the USSR